Morarano Marotampona (other name: Maritampona) is a town and commune in Madagascar. It belongs to the district of Fenoarivobe, which is a part of Bongolava Region. The population of the commune was estimated to be approximately 11,000 in 2001 commune census.

Only primary schooling is available. The majority 95% of the population of the commune are farmers.  The most important crop is rice, while other important products are maize and cassava. Services provide employment for 5% of the population.

The commune has 16 fokontany (villages).

References and notes 

Populated places in Bongolava